Amok syndrome is an aggressive dissociative behavioral pattern derived from Malaysia that led to the English phrase, running amok. The word derives from the Malay word , traditionally meaning "an episode of sudden mass assault against people or objects, usually by a single individual, following a period of brooding, which has traditionally been regarded as occurring especially in Malaysian culture but is now increasingly viewed as psychopathological behavior". The syndrome of "Amok" is found in the Diagnostic and Statistical Manual of Mental Disorders (DSM-IV TR). In the DSM-V, Amok syndrome is no longer considered a culture-bound syndrome, since the category of culture-bound syndrome has been removed.

Malay word 
The term amok originated from the Malay word meng-âmuk, which when roughly defined means "to make a furious and desperate charge". According to Malaysian and Indonesian cultures, amok is rooted in a deep spiritual belief. Malaysians traditionally believe that amok is caused by the hantu belian, which is an evil tiger spirit that enters one's body and causes the heinous act. As a result of the belief, those in Malay culture tolerate amok and deal with the after-effects with no ill will towards the assailant.

Although commonly used in a colloquial and less violent sense, the phrase is particularly associated with a specific sociopathic culture-bound syndrome in the cultures of Malaysia, Indonesia and Brunei. In a typical case of running amok, an individual (almost always male), having shown no previous sign of anger or any inclination to violence, will acquire a weapon (traditionally a sword or dagger, but possibly any of a variety of weapons) and in a sudden frenzy, will attempt to kill or seriously injure anyone he encounters and himself. Amok typically takes place in a well-populated or crowded area. Amok episodes of this kind normally end with the attacker being killed by bystanders or committing suicide, eliciting theories that amok may be a form of intentional suicide in cultures where suicide is heavily stigmatized. Those who do not commit suicide and are not killed typically lose consciousness, and upon regaining consciousness, claim amnesia.

An early Western description of the practice appears in the journals of British explorer Captain James Cook, who encountered amok firsthand in 1770 during a voyage around the world. Cook writes of individuals behaving in a reckless, violent manner, without cause and "indiscriminately killing and maiming villagers and animals in a frenzied attack."

A widely accepted explanation links amok with male honour (amok by women and children is virtually unknown).
Running amok would thus be both a way of escaping the world (since perpetrators were normally killed or committed suicide) and re-establishing one's reputation as a man to be feared and respected.

Contemporary psychiatric syndrome 
In 1849, Amok was officially classified as a psychiatric condition based on numerous reports and case studies that showed the majority of individuals who committed amok were, in some sense, mentally ill. "Running amok," is used to refer to the behavior of someone who, in the grip of strong emotion, obtains a weapon, which is usually a gun, and begins attacking people usually ending in the murdering of an innumerable number of people. For about twenty years, this type of behavior has been described as a culture-bound syndrome. As of the DSM-V, the culture-bound syndrome category has been removed, meaning that this particular condition is no longer be categorized as such. Culture-bound syndromes are seen as those conditions that only occur in certain societies whereas standard psychiatric diagnoses are not seen that way regardless if there is some sort of cultural limitation.

Recent research has revealed that Amok syndrome is not culture-specific but a syndrome that could happen anywhere around the world because anyone could experience an episode of Amok. Throughout history, mass murders have occurred in the United States, such as the Columbine massacre and the massacre at Sandy Hook Elementary School, bringing into question if Amok syndrome is based on mental illness or the simple act of committing mass murder. Amok syndrome, would in turn, be more prevalent in other societies and not only in Malay cultures. In fact, there are other societies like Polynesia, such as "cafard," and Puerto Rico, "mal de pelea," that have similar syndromes with different terms.

Forms 
Though the DSM-IV does not differentiate between them, observers historically described two forms of amok: beramok and amok. Beramok, considered to be more common, was associated with personal loss and preceded by a period of depression and brooding. Amok, the rarer form, was believed to stem from rage, perceived insult or a vendetta against a person.

Historical and cross-cultural comparisons 
Early travelers in Asia sometimes describe a kind of military amok, in which soldiers apparently facing inevitable defeat suddenly burst into a frenzy of violence which so startled their enemies that it either delivered victory or at least ensured what the soldier in that culture considered an honourable death.

Tomé Pires in his Suma Oriental, observed the custom of the Javanese people in 1513:There are among the nations no men who are amocos like those in the Javanese nation. Amocos means men who are determined to die (to run amuck). Some of them do it when they are drunk, and these are the common people; but the noblemen are much in the habit of challenging each other to duels, and they kill each other over their quarrels; and this is the custom of the country. Some of them kill themselves on horseback, and some of them on foot, according to what they have decided.Duarte Barbosa in 1514 recorded the Javanese people in Malacca:They have very good arms and fight valiantly. There are some of them who if they fall ill of any severe illness, vow to God that if they remain in health they will of their own accord seek another more honourable death for his service, and as soon as they get well they take a dagger in their hands and go out into the streets and kill as many persons as they meet, both men, women and children, in such wise that they go like mad dogs, killing until they are killed. These are called amuco. And as soon as they see them begin this work, they cry out saying, amuco, amuco, in order that people may take care of themselves, and they kill them with dagger and spear thrusts. Many of these Javans live in this city with wives and children and property.An example would be during the Battle of Bukit Chandu in Singapore during World War II, when 41 outnumbered soldiers of the Malay Regiment, led by Adnan Saidi, charged and went all out against a 13,000-strong invading Japanese army. They continued the fight, armed with just knives and bayonets, for three days before they were finally defeated.

This form of amok appears to resemble the Scandinavian Berserker, mal de pelea (Puerto Rico), and iich'aa (Navaho). The Zulu battle trance is another example of the tendency of certain groups to work themselves up into a killing frenzy.

In contemporary Indonesia, the term amok (amuk) generally refers not to individual violence, but to frenzied violence by mobs. Indonesians now commonly use the term 'gelap mata' (literally 'darkened eyes') to refer to individual amok. Laurens van der Post experienced the phenomenon in the East Indies and wrote in 1955:

In the Philippines, amok also means unreasoning murderous rage by an individual. In 1876, the Spanish governor-general of the Philippines José Malcampo coined the term juramentado for the behavior (from juramentar – "to take an oath"), surviving into modern Philippine languages as huramentado. It has historically been linked with the Moro people of Mindanao, particularly in the Sulu Archipelago, in connection with societal and cultural pressures.

According to the Encyclopædia Britannica Eleventh Edition, some notable cases have occurred among the Rajputs. In 1634, the eldest son of the raja of Jodhpur ran amok at the court of Shah Jahan, failing in his attack on the emperor, but killing five of his officials. During the 18th century, again, at Hyderabad (Sind), two envoys, sent by the Jodhpur chief in regard to a quarrel between the two states, stabbed the prince and twenty-six of his suite before they themselves fell.

In Popular Culture 
The Malaysian mythology surrounding hantu belian possessing humans and killing at random is a crucial plot point in The Night Tiger by Yangsze Choo.

See also 
 Active shooter
 Banzai charge
 Berserker
 Grisi siknis
 Going postal
 Suicide by cop
 Juramentado
 List of rampage killers
 Osama bin Laden (elephant)
 Musth (in elephants)
 Psychogenic non-epileptic seizures
 Road rage
 Spree killer
 Tantrum
 Amok Time

Notes

References 

Culture-bound syndromes
Malay words and phrases
Rampages